Angelus Exuro pro Eternus (grammatically incorrect Latin intended to mean "Angels Burned for Eternity") is the fifth studio album by Swedish black metal band Dark Funeral. The album was officially released on November 18, 2009, via Regain Records. It was recorded at The Abyss Studio in Grangärde, Sweden, with engineer and producer Peter Tägtgren, who also produced Dark Funeral's earlier studio albums (with the exception of Attera Totus Sanctus). The record was then mastered by Jonas Kjellgren at the Black Lodge Studios. Angelus Exuro pro Eternus is the last album to feature vocalist Emperor Magus Caligula, the only album to feature bassist B-Force and the first to feature Dominator on drums.

Upon release, the album was met with rave reviews by music critics and band fans, with only few reviewers giving the work negative or average ratings.

Musically, it has been described as the band's most technical and varied album to date, with considerably more progression and innovation while remaining "true to its roots". The cover artwork for Angelus Exuro Pro Eternus was created by Daniel "Morbid" Valeriani.

Video material
The album is also available with a bonus live DVD, which contains approximately 55 minutes of previously unreleased material. The DVD was professionally filmed with 6 cameras during the band's highly acclaimed 15th anniversary special show during the Peace & Love festival in Borlänge, Sweden, on June 28, 2008. The album also includes two versions (censored and uncensored) of their video for the track "My Funeral". The video was shot over the August 21–23 weekend and was released on October 4, 2009.

On October 7, 2009, three days later after the initial air of the video, after nearly 30,000 views, the full and uncensored version of "My Funeral" had been pulled from Myspace, causing a backlash from fans. This forced the band to upload a censored version of the video in response.

Track listing

DVD track listing
Live at Peace & Love festival on June 28, 2008, in Borlänge, Sweden.

 "Intro"
 "King Antichrist"
 "Diabolis Interium"
 "The Secrets of the Black Arts"
 "The Arrival of Satan's Empire"
 "Goddess of Sodomy"
 "666 Voices Inside"
 "Vobiscum Satanas"
 "Hail Murder"
 "Atrum Regina"
 "An Apprentice of Satan"

Personnel

Dark Funeral
Lord Ahriman – guitar
Emperor Magus Caligula – vocals
Chaq Mol – guitar
Dominator – drums
B-Force – bass guitar

Production
Peter Tägtgren – production, mixing, engineering
Jonas Kjellgren – mastering
Carlos Aguilar – photography

References

External links
Dark Funeral's official Myspace page

Dark Funeral albums
Regain Records albums
2009 albums
Albums produced by Peter Tägtgren